The 2013 Asian Fencing Championships was held in Shanghai, China from 4 June to 9 June 2013.

Medal summary

Men

Women

Medal table

References

External links
Results at FIE

Asian Championship
Asian Fencing Championships
Asian Fencing Championships
Sports competitions in Shanghai
International fencing competitions hosted by China
June 2013 sports events in China